Triumph is the fourteenth studio album by the Jacksons, released in October 1980 by Epic Records.

The album was certified Platinum by the Recording Industry Association of America (RIAA) in the United States and peaked at No. 10 on the US Billboard Top LPs & Tape chart. Triumph sold three million copies worldwide in its original run. Hit singles from the album were "Lovely One", "Heartbreak Hotel" (which was later renamed "This Place Hotel" to avoid confusion with the Elvis Presley song "Heartbreak Hotel"), and "Can You Feel It".

The Jacksons shared lead vocals and solo spots on some songs on the album, but Michael Jackson, who had recently released his multi-platinum selling album Off the Wall (1979), handles most of the lead vocals and writing duties. Triumph was the Jacksons' first album to reach number-one on the US Billboard R&B Albums chart since Maybe Tomorrow in 1971. The album sold over two million copies worldwide, and the Jacksons did not release another studio LP until Victory in 1984. On December 10, 1980, Triumph achieved its Platinum certification in the United States for the sales of over one million copies in the country. It was also nominated for the Grammy Award for Best R&B Performance by a Duo or Group with Vocals in 1981.

Re-release
Triumph, was re-released on January 27, 2009 on Epic/Legacy, a division of Sony Music Entertainment, with three bonus tracks of rare 7-inch and 12-inch mixes previously unavailable on CD. Later in 2021, it returned to re-released album again in digital format on April 30, 2021 including Victory and 2300 Jackson Street.

Track listing

Personnel
The Jacksons
Michael Jackson – lead and backing vocals, percussion
Jackie Jackson – backing vocals, lead vocals (track 9)
Tito Jackson – guitar, backing vocals
Marlon Jackson – backing vocals, timpani (track 5), co-lead vocals (track 8)
Randy Jackson – percussion, backing vocals, co-lead vocals (track 1)
Additional personnel

David Williams – guitar (1-5, 7-9)
Paul Jackson Jr. – guitar (5)
Greg Poree – guitar (6)
Michael Sembello – guitar (2, 5, 8)
Phil Upchurch – guitar (3)
Michael Boddicker – synthesizer (7, 9)
Ronnie Foster – keyboards (1, 9)
Webster Lewis – synthesizer (7)
Greg Phillinganes – keyboards (1-9), synthesizers (7)
Gary Coleman – vibraphone (1, 7, 8)
Clay Drayton – bass (6, 8)
Mike McKinney – bass (4)
Nathan Watts – bass (1-3, 5, 7)
Ollie E. Brown – drums (1, 2, 4-9)
Lenny Castro – percussion (9)
Paulinho da Costa – percussion (2, 3, 5-8)
Gary Herbig – flute (7)
Larry Hall – horns (4, 7)
Jerry Hey – horns (4, 5, 7)
Kim Hutchcroft – horns (4, 7)
Bill Reichenbach – horns (4, 7)
La Toya Jackson – voice scream (5)
Julia Tillman Waters, Maxine Willard Waters, Stephanie Spruill – backing vocals (track 5)
Audra Tillman, Brian Stilwell, Brigette Bush, Gerry Gruberth, Lita Aubrey, Peter Wade, Rhonda Gentry, Roger Kenerly II, Soloman Daniels, Yolanda Kenerly – backing vocals (The Children's Choir) (track 1)
Arnold McCuller, Bob Mack, Bunny Hull, Carmen Twillie, Carolyn Dennis, Gerry Garrett, Gregory Wright, Jim Gilstrap, Josie James, Lewis Price, Lisa Roberts, Paulette Brown, Paulette McWilliams, Phyllis St. James, Tyrell "Rock" Deadrick, Roger Kenerly-Saint, Ronald Vann, Roy Galloway, Venetta Fields – backing vocals (The Adults' Choir) (track 1)

Production
Produced, arranged, written and composed by the Jacksons except for "Everybody" (written by Michael Jackson, Tito Jackson and Mike McKinney)
Greg Phillinganes – associate producer
Tom Perry – engineer
Tom "Tom Tom 84" Washington – arrangements on "Can You Feel It", "Lovely One", "Your Ways" and "Heartbreak Hotel" 
Jerry Hey – arrangements on "Everybody" and "Heartbreak Hotel"
Jerry Peters – arrangements on "Time Waits for No One", "Give It Up" and string arrangements (6, 8)

Charts

Weekly charts

Year-end charts

Singles

Certifications

References

External links
 The Jacksons - Triumph (1980) album releases & credits at Discogs

1980 albums
The Jackson 5 albums
Epic Records albums
Albums produced by Michael Jackson
Albums recorded at Capitol Studios
Albums recorded at Sound City Studios